FIFA Football 2002, commonly known as FIFA 2002 and known in North America as FIFA Soccer 2002: Major League Soccer, is a football simulation video game released in 2001, produced by Electronic Arts and released by EA Sports. FIFA 2002 is the ninth game in the FIFA series.

Power bars for passes were introduced, and dribbling reduced in order to attain a higher challenge level. The power bar can also be customised to suit the gamer's preference. The game also includes club emblems for many more European clubs as well as for major Dutch clubs such as PSV, AFC Ajax and Feyenoord, although there was no Dutch league of any kind (they were under the "Rest of World" header). This game also features, for the first time, the Swiss Super League, at the cost of excluding the Greek League. A card reward system licensed from Panini was also introduced where, after winning a particular competition, a star player card is unlocked. There is also a bonus game with the nations that had automatically qualified for the 2002 World Cup (France, Japan and South Korea), in which the player tries to improve the FIFA ranking of their chosen team by participating in international friendlies.

Many of the international teams in the game are not licensed (some of them down to the players' names like the Netherlands), as well as smaller countries such as Barbados, who were only given numbers as player names. To date, this was the last FIFA edition (not counting the World Cup versions) to feature the Japanese national team, since Japan Football Association would go on to concede exclusive rights to Konami's Pro Evolution Soccer series. Also, this was the final FIFA edition to feature the Israel Premier League and its teams.

France and Arsenal star Thierry Henry is featured as the cover star. FIFA Football 2002 the last FIFA for 10 years to only have one person as the cover star, before Lionel Messi appeared alone on FIFA 13.

Reception

Gary Whitta reviewed the PlayStation 2 version of the game for Next Generation, rating it four stars out of five, and stated that "With improved tactics and graphics, FIFA 2002 once again cements itself at the top of the virtual soccer universe."

The game was met with positive reception.  GameRankings and Metacritic gave it a score of 82% and 77 out of 100 for the PC version; 81% and 81 out of 100 for the GameCube version; 79% and 81 out of 100 for the PlayStation version; and 79% and 82 out of 100 for the PlayStation 2 version.  In Japan, Famitsu gave it a score of 34 out of 40 for the GameCube version, and 32 out of 40 for the PS2 version.

GameSpot named FIFA Football 2002 a runner-up in its annual award category for the best traditional sports console game, which went to NBA 2K2.

Notes

References

External links

2001 video games
Electronic Arts games
EA Sports games
Association football video games
Cancelled Game Boy Advance games
2
GameCube games
PlayStation (console) games
PlayStation 2 games
Video games developed in Canada
Video games scored by BT (musician)
Windows games
Video games set in 2001
Video games set in 2002
La Liga licensed video games
D.I.C.E. Award for Sports Game of the Year winners